Hema Srinivasan (born 1959) is a mathematician specializing in commutative algebra and algebraic geometry. Originally from India, she is a professor of mathematics at the University of Missouri.

Srinivasan was a National Science Talent Scholar in India beginning in 1975.
She obtained her B.Sc.(Hons)  from Bombay University, where she won the Ghia Prize for mathematics in 1978,
as well as an M.S. from Indiana University Bloomington in 1982. She completed her Ph.D. at Brandeis University in 1986. Her dissertation, supervised by David Buchsbaum, was Multiplicative Structures on Some Canonical Resolutions. After working as a Visiting Instructor at Michigan State University from 1986 to 1988 and as a Research Assistant Professor Purdue University from 1988 to 1989, she joined the University of Missouri faculty as an assistant professor in 1989. At Missouri, she has supervised 6 doctoral students  and is currently the faculty advisor for the Association for Women in Mathematics Student Chapter.

She is part of the 2018 class of Fellows of the American Mathematical Society, elected "for contributions to algebra and algebraic geometry, mentoring, and service to the mathematical community".

References

External links
Home page

1959 births
Living people
20th-century American mathematicians
21st-century American mathematicians
Indian women mathematicians
American women mathematicians
Indiana University Bloomington alumni
University of Missouri faculty
Fellows of the American Mathematical Society
American people of Indian descent
University of Mumbai alumni
20th-century Indian mathematicians
20th-century women mathematicians
21st-century women mathematicians
Mathematicians from Missouri
20th-century American women
21st-century American women
20th-century Indian women